Debra J. Gillett is an English actress who has appeared in productions including The Witches, Chimera, Truckers, Casualty, Just William, Dalziel and Pascoe, Spooks, Doctor Who, Soul Music, and Cranford.

Career 
Gillett's stage work includes Limehouse (2017). In 2018 she played The Nurse ("a cartoonish delight") in Patrick Marber's adaptation of Eugène Ionesco's Exit the King at the Royal National Theatre, and was a "sympathetic" Queen Charlotte in Adam Penford's adaptation of The Madness of George III at the Nottingham Playhouse.

Personal life 
Gillett is the wife of playwright Patrick Marber. They married in 2002 and have three children.

Filmography

Film

Television

References

External links

British actresses
Year of birth missing (living people)
Living people